Lego DC Super Hero Girls: Super-Villain High is a 2018 American computer-animated superhero comedy film based on the DC Super Hero Girls franchise, produced by Warner Bros. Animation. It is the fourth film in the DC Super Hero Girls franchise, as well as the second and final Lego branded film in the series to be based on the DC Super Hero Girls, before the franchise itself got rebooted by Lauren Faust in January 2019. It was digitally released on May 1, 2018 and was followed by a DVD release on May 15, 2018.

Premise

It's up to Lego DC Super Hero Girls to uncover the truth about Uber High. This test is one that the Lego DC Super Hero Girls cannot fail!

Cast

Yvette Nicole Brown as Principal Amanda Waller
Greg Cipes as Beast Boy
Romi Dames as Lena Luthor, Divide
John DiMaggio as Gorilla Grodd, Wildcat
Teala Dunn as Bumblebee
Ashley Eckstein as Cheetah
Anais Fairweather as Supergirl
Nika Futterman as Hawkgirl 
Grey Griffin as Wonder Woman, Lois Lane
Josh Keaton as Flash
Maurice Lamarche as Oberon, Red Tornado
Danica McKellar as Frost 
Cristina Milizia as Jessica Cruz, Green Lantern
Khary Payton as Cyborg, Wizard Shazam
Cristina Pucelli as Catwoman
Kevin Michael Richardson as Doctor Fate, Delivery Man
Meredith Salenger as Backlash, Lashina
Ashlyn Selich as Batgirl
Stephanie Sheh as Katana
Tara Strong as Harley Quinn, Poison Ivy, Principal Taller
Fred Tatasciore as Seven Sins

Reception
Renee Longstreet for Common Sense Media gave the film a three out of five star rating and commented, "If derring-do and physical conflict are popular with girls as well as boys in today's marketplace, Warner Bros., DC Comics, and Lego have created a franchise that continues to build an audience. How enviable that is remains a question that parents and professionals consider. Does the violence go down easier for an 8-year-old when the participants are tiny plastic toys? Lego DC SuperHero Girls: Super-Villain High is filled with scenes of can-do girls battling and outwitting the power-hungry Lena Luthor and her temporary accomplices. The story is easy to follow, has suspense and a few mild twists and turns, and does offer some opportunities for messages about friendship, trust, competition, and teamwork. And there's some fun as well, as the girls -- in control at all times -- prove to be as unstoppable as they are smart and kind."

See also
DC Super Hero Girls
Lego DC Super Hero Girls
Lego DC Super Hero Girls: Brain Drain

References

External links 

2018 direct-to-video films
DC Super Hero Girls films
2018 computer-animated films
Films about sentient toys
Direct-to-video animated films based on DC Comics
2010s superhero comedy films
2010s American animated films
2010s direct-to-video animated superhero films
Brain Drain
Warner Bros. Animation animated films
Warner Bros. direct-to-video animated films
American children's animated comedy films
American children's animated superhero films
2010s English-language films
Lego DC Comics Super Heroes films